Badamrao Pandit is a leader of Shiv Sena from Beed district in Marathwada, India. He was member of the legislative assembly from Georai (Vidhan Sabha constituency) and a former minister of state in Maharashtra.

Positions held
 1995: Elected to Maharashtra Legislative Assembly
 1999: Re-elected to Maharashtra Legislative Assembly
 2009: Re-elected to Maharashtra Legislative Assembly
 2009: Appointed as minister of state in Maharashtra Government

References

External links
 The Shivsena

People from Beed
Maharashtra MLAs 2009–2014
Living people
Shiv Sena politicians
1955 births